John Driscoll (born 3 January 1969) is an Irish sailor. He competed in the Finn event at the 1996 Summer Olympics.

References

External links
 

1969 births
Living people
Irish male sailors (sport)
Olympic sailors of Ireland
Sailors at the 1996 Summer Olympics – Finn
Place of birth missing (living people)